Sam-D Petchyindee Academy is a retired Thai Muay Thai fighter. He fought under Sia Boat, Nuttadaj Vachirattanawong, the leader of the Petchyindee promotion.

Biography 
Sam-D started boxing at 8 years old and was eventually picked up by the famous Petchyindee Academy camp at 18 years old. He was considered a top fighter from 2008 and up until his retirement in 2018. He had a fierce rivalry with Wanchai Kiatmuu9 whom he fought 6 times, with 4 wins to himself and 2 wins for Wanchai. He also had fierce rivalry with Satanmuanglek Numponthep, whom he had lost to thrice between 2013 and 2015. He finally won against Satanmuanglek, by KO, on his run for the Paedpakan Tournament title in 2017. He would retire the year after, at 25 years of age.

Titles and accomplishments

Lumpinee Stadium
 2012 Lumpinee Stadium 108 lbs Champion

Professional Boxing Association of Thailand (PAT) 
 2013 Thailand 108 lbs Champion

Siam Omnoi Stadium
 2014 Siam Omnoi Stadium 108 lbs Champion

 True4U
 2017 Paedprakan Tournament 112 lbs Champion

Fight record

|-  style="background:#fbb;"
| 2018-09-13|| Loss||align=left| Raktemroy Visootjaroenyon ||  ||  Thailand || Decision || 5 || 3:00
|-  style="background:#fbb;"
| 2018-03-07|| Loss||align=left| Phetmuangchon Por.Suantong || Rajadamnern Stadium || Bangkok, Thailand || Decision || 5 || 3:00
|-  style="background:#cfc;"
| 2018-08-08|| Win||align=left| Priewpak Sor.Jor.Vichitpaedriw || Rajadamnern Stadium || Bangkok, Thailand || Decision || 5 || 3:00
|-  style="background:#fbb;"
| 2017-12-24|| Loss ||align=left| Sarawut Sor.Jor.Vichitpaedriw || Rangsit Stadium || Rangsit, Thailand || Decision || 5 || 3:00
|-  style="background:#cfc;"
| 2017-11-06|| Win||align=left| Priewpak Sor.Jor.Vichitpaedriw || Rajadamnern Stadium || Bangkok, Thailand || Decision || 5 || 3:00
|-  style="background:#fbb;"
| 2017-09-29|| Loss ||align=left| Phetmuangchon Por.Suantong || Lumpinee Stadium || Bangkok, Thailand || Decision || 5 || 3:00
|-  style="background:#cfc;"
| 2017-08-04|| Win||align=left| Satanmuanglek Numponthep || True4U Muaymanwansuk Paedprakan tournament final, Rangsit Stadium || Rangsit, Thailand || KO (Low kicks & Body kick) || 4 || 2:45
|-
! style=background:white colspan=9 |
|-  style="background:#cfc;"
| 2017-06-30|| Win||align=left| Tongnoi Lukbanyai || True4U Muaymanwansuk, Rangsit Stadium || Rangsit, Thailand || Decision ||5 || 3:00
|-  style="background:#cfc;"
| 2017-05-05|| Win||align=left| Priewpak Sor.Jor.Vichitpaedriw || Rangsit Stadium || Rangsit, Thailand || Decision ||5 || 3:00
|-  style="background:#fbb;"
| 2017-04-05|| Loss ||align=left| Priewpak Sor.Jor.Vichitpaedriw || Rajadamnern Stadium || Bangkok, Thailand || Decision || 5 || 3:00
|-  style="background:#cfc;"
| 2017-03-03|| Win||align=left| Wanchai Kiatmuu9 || Rangsit Stadium || Rangsit, Thailand || Decision ||5 || 3:00
|-  style="background:#fbb;"
| 2016-12-04|| Loss||align=left| Raktemroy Visootjaroenyon || Rajadamnern Stadium || Bangkok, Thailand || Decision || 5 || 3:00
|-  style="background:#cfc;"
| 2016-10-05|| Win||align=left| Jaroenpon Popthiratham || Rajadamnern Stadium || Bangkok, Thailand || Decision || 5 || 3:00
|-  style="background:#fbb;"
| 2016-06-28|| Loss||align=left| Raktemroy Visootjaroenyon || Lumpinee Stadium || Bangkok, Thailand || Decision || 5 || 3:00
|-  style="background:#cfc;"
| 2016-05-23|| Win||align=left| Luktoy FA Group || Rajadamnern Stadium || Bangkok, Thailand || Decision || 5 || 3:00
|-  style="background:#cfc;"
| 2016-04-07|| Win||align=left| Jaroenpon Popthiratham || Rajadamnern Stadium || Bangkok, Thailand || Decision || 5 || 3:00
|-  style="background:#fbb;"
| 2016-03-05|| Loss||align=left| Jaroenpon Popthiratham || Omnoi Stadium || Samut Sakhon, Thailand || Decision || 5 || 3:00
|-  style="background:#fbb;"
| 2016-02-08|| Loss||align=left| Wanchai Kiatmuu9 ||Rajadamnern Stadium || Bangkok, Thailand || Decision || 5 || 3:00
|-  style="background:#fbb;"
| 2015-12-25|| Loss||align=left| Satanmuanglek Numponthep || Lumpinee Stadium || Bangkok, Thailand || Decision || 5 || 3:00
|-
! style=background:white colspan=9 |
|-  style="background:#cfc;"
| 2015-11-11|| Win||align=left| Detchaiya PetchyindeeAcademy || Rajadamnern Stadium || Bangkok, Thailand || KO || 4 ||
|-  style="background:#cfc;"
| 2015-09-14|| Win||align=left| Rit Jitmuangnon || Rajadamnern Stadium || Bangkok, Thailand || Decision || 5 || 3:00
|-  style="background:#cfc;"
| 2015-08-11|| Win||align=left| Detchaiya PetchyindeeAcademy || Lumpinee Stadium || Bangkok, Thailand || Decision || 5 || 3:00
|-  style="background:#fbb;"
| 2015-06-29 || Loss ||align=left| Ronachai Santi-Ubon ||  || Udon Thani, Thailand || Decision || 5 || 3:00
|-  style="background:#cfc;"
| 2015-05-23|| Win||align=left| Chopper Kor.Sapaotong || Omnoi Stadium || Samut Sakhon, Thailand || Decision || 5 || 3:00
|-  style="background:#fbb;"
| 2015-04-02|| Loss||align=left| Wanchai Kiatmuu9 || Rajadamnern Stadium || Bangkok, Thailand || Decision || 5 || 3:00
|-  style="background:#fbb;"
| 2015-03-06|| Loss||align=left| Thanadet TorPhran49 || Lumpinee Stadium || Bangkok, Thailand || Decision || 5 || 3:00
|-  style="background:#fbb;"
| 2015-01-26|| Loss||align=left| Wanchai Kiatmuu9 ||Rajadamnern Stadium || Bangkok, Thailand || Decision || 5 || 3:00
|-  style="background:#fbb;"
| 2014-10-28|| Loss ||align=left| Rungnarai Kiatmuu9 || Rajadamnern Stadium || Bangkok, Thailand || Decision || 5 || 3:00
|-  style="background:#cfc;"
| 2014-09-29|| Win||align=left| Detkart Por.Pongsawang || Rajadamnern Stadium || Bangkok, Thailand || Decision || 5 || 3:00
|-  style="background:#cfc;"
| 2014-09-06|| Win||align=left| Yodpadang Kiatbanjong || Omnoi Stadium || Samut Sakhon, Thailand || KO || 4 ||  
|-
! style=background:white colspan=9 |
|-  style="background:#cfc;"
| 2014-05-08|| Win ||align=left| Wanchai Kiatmuu9 ||Rajadamnern Stadium || Bangkok, Thailand || Decision || 5 || 3:00
|-  style="background:#cfc;"
| 2014-04-05|| Win ||align=left| Worachet Por Rungrum || Ladprao Stadium || Bangkok, Thailand || KO (Left High Kick)|| 5 ||
|-  style="background:#cfc;"
| 2014-02-22|| Win ||align=left| Phetlukfang Chor Pinarath || Ladprao Stadium || Bangkok, Thailand || Decision || 5 || 3:00
|-  style="background:#cfc;"
| 2014-01-24|| Win ||align=left|  Denlanna Sor Werapon  || Lumpinee Stadium || Bangkok, Thailand || KO (Left Cross)|| 3||
|-  style="background:#fbb;"
| 2013-12-03|| Loss||align=left|  Satanmuanglek Numponthep || Lumpinee Stadium || Bangkok, Thailand || Decision || 5 || 3:00
|-
! style=background:white colspan=9 |
|-  style="background:#fbb;"
| 2013-10-10|| Loss||align=left| Dokmaidang JSP || Rajadamnern Stadium || Bangkok, Thailand || Decision || 5 || 3:00
|-  style="background:#fbb;"
| 2013-09-13|| Loss||align=left| Satanmuanglek Numponthep || Lumpinee Stadium || Bangkok, Thailand || Decision || 5 || 3:00
|-  style="background:#cfc;"
| 2013-08-09|| Win||align=left| Rungnarai Kiatmuu9 || Lumpinee Stadium || Bangkok, Thailand || Decision || 5 || 3:00 
|-
! style=background:white colspan=9 |
|-  style="background:#fbb;"
| 2013-07-11|| Loss||align=left| Rungnarai Kiatmuu9 || Lumpinee Stadium || Bangkok, Thailand || Decision || 5 || 3:00
|-  style="background:#cfc;"
| 2013-06-12|| Win||align=left| Wanchai Kiatmuu9 ||Rajadamnern Stadium || Bangkok, Thailand || Decision || 5 || 3:00
|-  style="background:#fbb;"
| 2013-05-09|| Loss ||align=left| Rungnarai Kiatmuu9 || Rajadamnern Stadium || Bangkok, Thailand || Decision || 5 || 3:00
|-  style="background:#fbb;"
| 2013-03-29|| Loss||align=left| Chaisiri Sakniranrat || Lumpinee Stadium || Bangkok, Thailand || Decision || 5 || 3:00
|-
! style=background:white colspan=9 |
|-  style="background:#cfc;"
| 2013-03-01|| Win||align=left| Julong Ekbangsai || Lumpinee Stadium || Bangkok, Thailand || Decision || 5 || 3:00
|-  style="background:#cfc;"
| 2013-01-22|| Win||align=left| Wanchai Kiatmuu9 ||Lumpinee Stadium || Bangkok, Thailand || KO (Left Elbow) || 3 ||
|-  style="background:#cfc;"
| 2012-12-07|| Win||align=left| Sarawut Pitakparpadaeng || Lumpinee Stadium || Bangkok, Thailand || Decision || 5 || 3:00 
|-
! style=background:white colspan=9 |
|-  style="background:#cfc;"
| 2012-11-02|| Win||align=left| Wanchai Kiatmuu9 || Lumpinee Stadium || Bangkok, Thailand || Decision || 5 || 3:00
|-  style="background:#cfc;"
| 2012-10-09|| Win||align=left| Jumong Ekbangsai || Lumpinee Stadium || Bangkok, Thailand || Decision || 5 || 3:00
|-  style="background:#cfc;"
| 2012-08-07|| Win||align=left| Rongrungsak Lukromklao || Lumpinee Stadium || Bangkok, Thailand || Decision || 5 || 3:00
|-  style="background:#cfc;"
| 2012-01-24|| Win||align=left| Kaka Tharanasuranakorn || Lumpinee Stadium || Bangkok, Thailand || KO (Knees)|| 3 ||  
|-
| colspan=9 | Legend:

References

Sam-D PetchyindeeAcademy
Living people
1993 births